Pipe Creek Township is one of fourteen townships in Madison County, Indiana, United States. As of the 2010 census, its population was 12,497 and it contained 5,828 housing units.

History
Pipe Creek Township was organized in 1833, and named after Pipe Creek.

Geography

Cities, towns, villages
 Elwood (vast majority)
 Frankton (north side)
 West Elwood

Unincorporated towns
 Dundee at 
 South Elwood at

Cemeteries
The township contains these nine cemeteries: Carr, Elwood, Howard, Prewett, Saint Josephs, Shell, Sigler, Stoken and Sunset Memorial Park.

Major highways
  Indiana State Road 13
  Indiana State Road 28
  Indiana State Road 37

Airports and landing strips
 Elwood Airport

Education
 Elwood Community School Corporation
 Frankton-Lapel Community Schools

Pipe Creek Township residents may obtain a free library card from the North Madison County Public Library System with branches in Elwood, Frankton, and Summitville.

Political districts
 Indiana's 6th congressional district
 State House District 36
 State Senate District 20
 State Senate District 25

References
 
 United States Census Bureau 2008 TIGER/Line Shapefiles
 IndianaMap

External links
 Indiana Township Association
 United Township Association of Indiana
 City-Data.com page for Pipe Creek Township

Townships in Madison County, Indiana
Townships in Indiana